Tyldesley cum Shakerley Urban District and its successor Tyldesley Urban District was, from 1894 to 1974, a local government district in Lancashire, England.

History
The township of Tyldesley cum Shakerley historically lay in the large ecclesiastical parish of Leigh and was a member of the Leigh Poor Law Union which was formed in 1837.

In 1863 Tyldesley cum Shakerley Local Government District was created when the township adopted the Local Government Act 1858.
A local board was formed to govern the town. 
The Local Government Act 1894 reconstituted the area as an urban district, and Tyldesley cum Shakerley Urban District Council replaced the local board. 
The urban district council consisted of fifteen members, representing five wards—North, East, South, West, and Shakerley.

The only change to boundaries was in 1933, when the Lancashire (Manchester and District) Review Order 
added Astley civil parish from the neighbouring Leigh Rural District and the urban district was renamed Tyldesley Urban District. 
In 1974 Tyldesley Urban District was abolished by the Local Government Act 1972 and its former area transferred to Greater Manchester to form part of the Metropolitan Borough of Wigan.

Tyldesley's town hall was originally in Lower Elliot Street, opposite the council's depot and fire station. In 1924 the township's Liberal Club which opened in 1881 was bought by the council as its town hall. Tyldesley UDC was responsible for the opening of Tyldesley Park on Astley Street in 1902, the provision of the Carnegie Library in 1909, and council housing estates at Sale Lane, Mosley Common and Shakerley.

References

Citations

Bibliography

External links
 Chairs of Tyldesley Local Board and Urban District, 1863-1974.

Districts of England created by the Local Government Act 1894
Districts of England abolished by the Local Government Act 1972
History of Lancashire
History of the Metropolitan Borough of Wigan
Local government in the Metropolitan Borough of Wigan
Urban districts of England
Tyldesley